Hondelagia is an extinct genus of snakefly in the Priscaenigmatidae family. The genus has been described three times under the same taxonomy, but was initially described by A. Bode in 1953. It currently contains one species, the Hondelagia reticulata which was described by Bode in 1953. It was found in Hondelage in Braunschweig. The genus was later described in 1992 by F. M. Carpenter and in 2002 by M. S. Engel. The genus' sister taxa is the extinct Priscaenigma. The species has no sister taxa.

References

Raphidioptera
Fossil taxa described in 1953
Fossil taxa described in 1992
Fossil taxa described in 2002
Early Jurassic insects
Prehistoric insects of Europe